Conway House may refer to:

in the United States
(by state)
Colonel Edward Power Conway House, Phoenix, Arizona, listed on the National Register of Historic Places (NRHP) in Maricopa County, Montana
Conway House (Camden, Maine), listed on the NRHP in Knox County, Maine
Conway House (Hamilton, Montana), listed on the NRHP in Ravalli County, Montana
Conway House (Falmouth, Virginia), listed on the NRHP in Stafford County, Virginia